Coleophora nomgona is a moth of the family Coleophoridae. It is found in Hungary, Romania, Ukraine, southern Russia and Mongolia.

References

nomgona
Moths described in 1975
Moths of Europe
Moths of Asia